Route 373 is a provincial highway located in the Saguenay–Lac-Saint-Jean region in central Quebec. The  highway stretches from just northeast of Saint-Félicien to Dolbeau-Mistassini with both ends at junctions of Route 169. It also runs through most of the length along Lac Saint-Jean.

Towns located along Route 373

 Dolbeau-Mistassini
 Saint-Félicien

Major intersections

See also

 List of Quebec provincial highways

References

External links 
 Official Transports Quebec Map 
 route 373 on Google Maps

373